The Wait is the seventh studio album by Australia vocal duo Vika and Linda Bull, released on 17 September 2021. It is their first album of original music since Love Is Mighty Close in 2002. In a statement, Linda Bull said "It took us three times to make this record, it kept getting delayed and we've been waiting 19 years to make this record... waiting for more songs. Waiting for the right opportunity."

At the 2022 ARIA Music Awards, the album was nominated for Best Adult Contemporary Album.

Singles
 "Raise Your Hand" was released on July 1, 2021, and is "a fan favourite at live shows". Linda Bull says,"As soon as we sing 'Raise Your Hand', the hands go up in the crowd." With all that’s going on at the moment, this song is relevant in so many ways. It's anthemic, "raise your hand, speak up, say what you want, don't be ignored."
 "My Heart Is in the Wrong Place" was also released on July 1, 2021. Vika Bull said "[it] is one of those songs that everyone can relate to. Sometimes you feel like giving up, but something in you just makes you keep pushing through."
 "Like a Landslide" was released on August 10, 2021, as the album's third running single. The duo took to Facebook to say "'Like a Landslide' is about being on the road when you can't wait to get home and be with your loved one again."
 "Lover Don't Keep Me Waiting" was released on September 10, 2021, as the album's fourth single, with the duo saying: "We love the lyric in this song 'You better make your move before I go and change my mind'."

Reception
Jeff Jenkins from Stack called The Wait "the album of the year", writing: "This is the sound of two women taking control of their careers and refusing to play it safe... The result is as close to perfect as any record you'll ever hear."

Track listing

Charts

Release history

References

2021 albums
Vika and Linda albums
Bloodlines (record label) albums